The Recuay Province is one of twenty provinces of the Ancash Region in Peru. Its seat is the town of Recuay.

Geography 
The southern parts of the Cordillera Blanca and the Cordillera Negra traverse the province. Some of the highest peaks of the province are listed below:

Qiruqucha is one of the largest lakes of the province.

Political division

Recuay is divided into ten districts, which are:
 Catac 
 Cotaparaco 
 Huayllapampa 
 Llacllin 
 Marca 
 Pampas Chico 
 Pararin 
 Recuay 
 Tapacocha 
 Ticapampa

Ethnic groups 
The province is inhabited by indigenous citizens of Quechua descent. Spanish is the language which the majority of the population (63.32%) learnt to speak in childhood, 36.42% of the residents started speaking using the Quechua language (2007 Peru Census).

See also 
 Hatun Mach'ay
 Pastururi Glacier
 Qishqiqucha
 Quñuqqucha

Sources 

Recuay Province